Moritz Jursitzky (27 January 1861 in Andělská Hora – 28 August 1936 in Vienna) was an Austrian-Silesian writer.

Life
Born as a son of a weaver master craftsman, Moritz Jursitzky worked as well as a weaver for a long time. Only late in his life it was possible to earn a living with his writing. Starting with 1909 he was supported by the "German Schiller foundation" (deutsche Schillerstiftung).

List of publications
Novels:
 "Die Förster-Zilli": The forester Zilli - artistnovel from the World War I prewartime
 "Um Recht und Ehre": About right an honour
 "Auf steiler Dornenbahn" : On steep thorn alley
 "Serenissimus als Bürger" : Serenissimus as citizen
 "Das hungernde Wien" : The starving vienna
 "Der Parnass" : The Parnass

Silesian poems:
 "Hoch'naus!": burlesque written in Silesian German dialect

References

External links 
 Family history, with abstracts of his work

1861 births
1936 deaths
People from Bruntál District
Austrian male writers
People from Austrian Silesia